Gandoh is a surname. Notable people with the surname include:

 Hiroshi Gondoh (born 1938), Japanese baseball pitcher and manager
 Ryan Gondoh (born 1997), English football winger

See also
 Gandoh